Global Perspectives may refer to:

 A journal published by Indigo Era
 A television interview show produced by WUCF-TV